Maize Airport (formerly 70K) is a privately owned, public-use airport located two nautical miles (2.3 mi, 3.7 km) southeast of the central business district of Maize, a city in Sedgwick County, Kansas, United States, northwest of Wichita.

Facilities and aircraft
It has one runway designated 17/35 with a turf surface measuring 2,100 by 70 feet (640 x 21 m).

For the 12-month period ending April 29, 2008, the airport had 2,300 aircraft operations, an average of 191 per month. At that time there were 12 aircraft based at this airport: 92% single-engine and 8% helicopter.

References

External links
 Maize Airport (70K) page at Kansas DOT website
 Aerial photo as of 31 March 1996 from USGS The National Map

Defunct airports in Kansas
Airports in Kansas
Transportation in Sedgwick County, Kansas
Buildings and structures in Sedgwick County, Kansas